Untanneh Tokef, Unthanneh Toqeph, Un'taneh Tokef, or Unsanneh Tokef   (ונתנה תקף) ("Let us speak of the awesomeness ") is a piyyut that has been a part of the Rosh Hashanah and Yom Kippur liturgy in some traditions of rabbinical Judaism for centuries. It introduces the Kedusha of Musaf for these days. It is chanted while the Torah ark is open and the congregants are standing. It is the "central poem of the High Holy Day [of the Day of Atonement]." The ArtScroll machzor calls it "one of the most stirring compositions in the entire liturgy of the Days of Awe."

History

Traditional retelling 
The following story is recorded in the 13th century commentary Or Zarua, who attributes the writing to Rabbi Ephraim of Bonn (a compiler of Jewish martyrologies, died ca. 1200).

According to the story, Untanneh Tokef was composed by an 11th-century sage named Rabbi Amnon of Mainz (or Mayence, in Germany) – who, apart from this one story, is unknown to history. As a friend of the (otherwise unnamed) Archbishop of Mainz (or, perhaps, the otherwise unnamed Governor), Rabbi Amnon was pressured to convert to Christianity. As a delaying tactic, he requested three days to consider the offer; immediately he regretted intensely giving even the pretense that he could possibly accept a foreign religion. After spending the three days in prayer, he refused to come to the archbishop as promised, and, when he was forcibly brought to the archbishop's palace, he begged that his tongue be cut out to atone for his sin. Instead, the archbishop ordered his hands and legs amputated — limb by limb — as punishment for not obeying his word to return after three days and for refusing to convert. At each amputation, Rabbi Amnon was again given the opportunity to convert, which he refused.  He was sent home, with his severed extremities, on a knight's shield.

This event occurred shortly before Rosh Hashanah. On that holiday, as he lay dying, Rabbi Amnon asked to be carried into the synagogue, where he recited the original composition of Unetanneh Tokef with his last breath (the story contains an ambiguous phrase that some commentators interpreted as saying that he did not merely die but that his body miraculously vanished). Three days later, he appeared in a dream to Rabbi Kalonymus ben Meshullam (died 1096), one of the great scholars and liturgists of Mainz, and begged him to transcribe the prayer and to see that it was included in the text of the High Holiday services. Thus, the legend concludes, Untanneh Tokef became a part of the standard liturgy.

Modern scholarship 

It was once speculated that Kalonymus is the true author of the poem. However, both the language and style are different from the other poems of Kalonymus. In addition, there is evidence that a very similar piyyut was being recited in Italy in contemporary with Kalonymus.

Since then, a copy of the poem was discovered in the Cairo Geniza, Fragment Cambridge T-S H8.6, originally dated by Eric Werner to the 8th century. Ben Outhwaite thought this date unrealistic considering the paper and script, instead dating it to the 11th century.

While medieval history testifies amply to the intense persecution of Jews by Christians at the time of the Crusades, there are difficulties with the legend that it was composed by Amnon. Not least of these is its portrayal of Amnon as an illustrious Torah giant, while Jewish history of that period provides no record of a 'Rav Amnon of Mainz' at all. It seems unlikely that a person of such tremendous stature would be remembered only in a single legend.  The received story has all the qualities of an urban legend - a heroic rabbi of whom there is no disparaging or even tedious information, an extremely cruel gentile villain (also without the problem of additional biographic details), the esteemed name and endorsement of Kalonymus, miraculous or extraordinary events, and supernatural instructions to include the poem in the annual liturgy.  Scholars have long known that there is no historical foundation for the story of Rabbi Amnon and that this story may have been inspired or derived from the Christian legend associated with Saint Emmeram of Regensburg. Moreover, the discovery of the Unetaneh Tokef prayer within the earliest strata of the Cairo Geniza materials, dating well before the 11th century, makes it almost impossible that the prayer could have been composed as the legend claims.

Additionally, some scholars see parallels with non-Jewish hymnology, suggesting that elements of the prayer stemmed from other sources.  It is possible that the Rabbi Amnon story was entirely invented, not necessarily by the author of Or Zarua, to legitimize a piyyut of doubtful origin or simply to satisfy popular curiosity about the background of such an impressive liturgical work. Indications of this are the absence of evidence of the existence of a Rabbi Amnon, the fact that the name Amnon is a variant of the Hebrew word for "faithful", the extravagance of the story, the conspicuous inclusion of Kalonymus, and evidences that this piyyut or something very similar was already in use before the time ascribed.

Yaakov Spiegel has argued that the prayer was written by Yannai in the sixth century. Authorship from Israel is supported by internal evidence, such as the concluding three-part remedy of 'repentance, prayer, and charity', which is found in exact permutation  in Genesis Rabbah (composed in Israel), yet not in Babylonian sources (e.g., Talmud Bavli cites a four-part remedy). Stylistically, the prayer indicates its composition in the land of Israel during the Byzantine period (namely 330–638).

Position in the prayer service

In the Ashkenazi rite, Untanneh Tokef  is inserted during the Mussaf, when the hazzan repeats the Amidah, as a silluk (parting poem) just before intoning the kedusha. In the Sephardic rite, Untanneh Tokef is usually omitted; however, some Sephardic congregations, mainly Moroccan, recite it immediately prior to the commencement of the Mussaf and some have the custom to recite it during the repetition on the first day. The congregation stands up to chant it and the Torah ark is opened.

It is one of the few piyyutim that is recited on both days of Rosh Hashanah and on Yom Kippur in the Polish and Italian traditions, whereas it is only said on Rosh Hashanah by Sephardim and German Ashkenazim, who have another silluk for Yom Kippur: "Mi Ya'arokh Eilekho".  In Reform practice, it was taken from the recitation of the Amidah and presented as an independent item in both Mincha and Yizkor services. Early Reform practice had the line about the angels trembling deleted, but it has been restored in more recent Reform prayerbooks.

In the version of the Italian Rite practiced in Rome, a variant of Untanneh Tokef is recited in the Mussaf service for Hoshana Rabbah, Kabbalistically considered the official conclusion of the Days of Awe. In this variant, the line וּבְיוֹם צוֹם כִּפּוּר יֵחָתֵמוּן "and on Yom Kippur they are sealed" is replaced with וּבְיוֹם הוֹשַׁעֲנָא רָבָּא יֵחָתֵמוּן "and on the day of Hoshana Rabbah they are sealed."

Themes and sources of Untanneh Tokef
Untanneh Tokef is recited immediately prior to and as an introduction for the kedusha prayer, during which the angelic sanctification of God is mentioned.  Untanneh Tokef adapts this daily praise to the specific elements intrinsic to the High Holidays, namely the Divine judgment of all existence. In most printed editions, Untanneh Tokef consists of four paragraphs, each reflecting a different aspect of this general topic.

The theme of a divine decree being written derives, at least in part, to a Talmudic teaching:
On Rosh Hashana, three books are opened [in Heaven] – one for the thoroughly wicked, one for the thoroughly righteous, and one for those in-between.  The thoroughly righteous are immediately inscribed clearly in the Book of Life.  The thoroughly wicked are immediately inscribed clearly in the Book of Death.  The fate of those in-between is postponed from Rosh Hashana until Yom Kippur, at which time those who are deserving are then inscribed in the Book of Life, those who are undeserving are then inscribed in the Book of Death.
As a token of this belief, the common greeting on Rosh Hashana is לשׁנה טוֹבה תּכּתב (Leshana tovah tikatev) – "May you be inscribed for a good year."

Fear and trembling
The first paragraph depicts the judgment day, where the angels in heaven tremble at the awe-inspiring event of the annual judgment of all creation, with the implication that man should also approach this day with trepidation.  The heavenly Book of Chronicles is opened, in which every human being's fate will be inscribed.

God judges us
The second paragraph continues this point, depicting how every event that will occur in the upcoming year is "written on Rosh Hashanah and sealed on Yom Kippur".  This paragraph is known by its opening words, BeRosh Hashana, and it is traditional that the litany of possible destinies is read with increasing speed from the phrase "Who shall rest and who shall wander" to the end of the paragraph.

This paragraph reaches its climax with the final line, said by all the congregants in unison, "But repentance, prayer, and righteousness avert the severe decree." This verse expresses the formula by which a man may obtain a reduction in the severity of the original decree, as expressed in the Bible (2 Chronicles 7:14), the Talmud (T.B., Rosh Hashana 16b; T.J. Ta'anith 2:1) and Midrash (Bereshit Rabbah 44:13). A Talmudic reference (Jerusalem Talmud, Taanit 2) has the sequence as prayer, charity, and repentance; and a prayer book from Salonika, handwritten in 1522, has this verse rearranged to conform to the Talmudic sequence. Interpreters disagree on whether to translate this line as "annul the severe decree" or as "annul the severity of the decree".  This distinction because the phrasing is ambiguous – and it would seem that the decree itself – namely, death in some form – cannot be totally and permanently avoided but that the immediacy or the cruelty of that death might be mitigated. Marc Saperstein, “Inscribed for Life or Death?” Journal of Reform Judaism 28:3 (1981), 19.

This line is usually printed in emphatic typeface. Usually, in smaller type, the words "fasting", "voice", and "money" appear above "repentance", "prayer", and "righteousness" respectively – those words are not read aloud but are intended as instructions on how to perform the three acts necessary to avoid (or reduce) the dire punishments. Additionally, in gematria each of the three words in small type have a value of 136, which is interpreted as meaning that each is equally important in averting stern judgment. Moreover, the words are each an acronym:     צום (fasting) is an acronym צעקה ושנוי מעשה ("cry out and change your ways"),  קול (voice) represents קדושה וטהר לבנו ("become more holy and purify our hearts"), and ממון (money) is an acronym for מוציא מחברו וגם נותן ("encourage others to give and oneself to give").

We are helpless
The third paragraph begs for Divine mercy on the basis of the fact that man by nature is sinful and innately impotent and mortal, which conditions will cause a merciful Deity to forgive his trespasses. The passage here echoes the despair found in the book of Koheleth (Ecclesiastes), but concludes—as does , from which it apparently draws—with the contrasting affirmation that God is eternal and enduring.

God is enduring
Finally, the fourth paragraph lyrically praises God as exalted above all existence, and begs Him to sanctify His Name by redeeming Israel – transitioning directly into the kedusha:

Popular culture
 The 1982 documentary Who Shall Live and Who Shall Die takes its title from the prayer's text.
 In 1990, Israeli composer Yair Rosenblum composed a new musical setting for the prayer. This version was first performed at a memorial for 11 soldiers from kibbutz Beit Hashita who fell during the 1973 Yom Kippur war, and is now often played on Israeli radio during the High Holy Days.
 Leonard Cohen's song "Who by Fire" (from the 1974 album New Skin for the Old Ceremony) was inspired by this poem.

Notes

Resources

Orthodox Union site with background
Video of Cantor Simon Cohen in concert recital of second paragraph, YouTube
 Rabbi Eliezer Melamed, The Story of the "Unetaneh Tokef" Prayer
 Prof. R. Katzoff, הדף השבועי ליום כפור, Bar- Ilan University. [in Hebrew]. רנון קצוף - ונתנה תוקף

Jewish liturgical poems
Works of unknown authorship
Rosh Hashanah
Yom Kippur
Hebrew words and phrases in Jewish prayers and blessings